The Morris Brown House is a historic house located in Providence, Rhode Island. The house was listed on the National Register of Historic Places on August 22, 1991.

Description and history 
It is a -story gambrel-roofed wood-frame structure with a large central chimney. The main block is four bays wide and three deep, with a rear ell connecting the house to a 20th-century garage. Documentary evidence suggests it was built in 1793, while architectural evidence suggests an earlier construction date. The house is a well-preserved example of a typical vernacular 18th-century Rhode Island farmhouse, and is one of the few 18th century houses remaining in the city.

See also
National Register of Historic Places listings in Providence, Rhode Island

References

Houses on the National Register of Historic Places in Rhode Island
Houses in Providence, Rhode Island
National Register of Historic Places in Providence, Rhode Island
Houses completed in 1793